Kuzma Andrianovich Andrianov (28 December 1904 — 13 March 1978) was a Soviet and Russian chemist and professor of Moscow Power Engineering Institute. Hero of Socialist Labour (1969).

Biography 
Kuzma Andrianovich Andrianov was born on 28 December 1904 (5 December in Old Style), 1904 in Kondrakovo village (now Zubtsovsky District, Tver Oblast, Russia). In 1930 he graduated from Chemical Faculty of Moscow State University. From 1929 to 1954 he worked at the All-Russian Electrotechnical Institute. In 1930—1932 he taught at Moscow Tannery Institute, in 1933—1941 — at D. Mendeleev University of Chemical Technology of Russia, in 1941—1959 at MPEI (professor since 1946).

In 1946-1953 he worked at the All-Russian Institute Of Aviation Materials. Since 1959 he was the Head of the Department of Polymer Synthesis at the Moscow Lomonosov Moscow State Institute of Molecular Biology. Since 1954 he also worked at Nesmeyanov Institute of Organoelement Compounds.

He was an Academician of the Academy of Sciences of the Soviet Union (1964; Corresponding Member since 1953), a member of CPSU since 1949 and an Honorary member of the Budapest Polytechnic University since 1965. He also was a Hero of Socialist Labour and a laureate of Lenin Prize.

He died on 13 March 1978 in Moscow and was at Novodevichy Cemetery.

Scientific work 
Andrianov was a specialist in the field of synthesis and technology of high-molecular compounds. In 1937 he was the first to synthesize polyorganosiloxanes. Since 1947 he has discovered the basic principles of synthesis of polymers with inorganic chains of molecules, including polyorganometallosiloxanes. He led the research of the synthesis of heat-resistant organosilicon polymers and materials based on them, which are widely used for the insulation of electrical machines, apparatuses, production of lubricants, plastics, paint and varnish coatings.

References 

1904 births
1978 deaths
20th-century chemists
Communist Party of the Soviet Union members
Academic staff of the D. Mendeleev University of Chemical Technology of Russia
Full Members of the USSR Academy of Sciences
Academic staff of Moscow Power Engineering Institute
Heroes of Socialist Labour
Stalin Prize winners
Lenin Prize winners
Recipients of the Order of Lenin
Recipients of the Order of the Red Banner of Labour
Recipients of the Order of the Red Star
Russian chemists
Soviet chemists
Burials at Novodevichy Cemetery